Éric Diard (born 21 July 1965) is a French politician who represented the 12th constituency of the Bouches-du-Rhône department in the National Assembly from 2002 to 2012 and again from 2017 to 2022. A member of The Republicans (LR), he was Mayor of Sausset-les-Pins from 2001 to 2017. As a Member of Parliament, Diard led a parliamentary investigation into Islamic radicalisation in French security services.

See also
 List of MPs who lost their seat in the 2022 French legislative election

References

1965 births
Living people
Politicians from Marseille
Rally for the Republic politicians
Union for a Popular Movement politicians
The Republicans (France) politicians
The Popular Right
Mayors of places in Provence-Alpes-Côte d'Azur
Members of Parliament for Bouches-du-Rhône
Deputies of the 12th National Assembly of the French Fifth Republic
Deputies of the 13th National Assembly of the French Fifth Republic
Deputies of the 15th National Assembly of the French Fifth Republic